The Men's K-1 1000m event at the 2010 South American Games was held over March 27 at 9:40.

Medalists

Results

References
Final

1000m K-1 Men